Julie Martine Debever (born 18 April 1988) is a French professional footballer who plays as a defender for Fleury. She plays for the France women's national football team, and was named in the squad for the 2019 FIFA Women's World Cup.

References

External links
 
 

1988 births
Living people
France women's international footballers
French women's footballers
Women's association football defenders
Paris FC (women) players
AS Saint-Étienne (women) players
En Avant Guingamp (women) players
Division 1 Féminine players
2019 FIFA Women's World Cup players
Inter Milan (women) players
French expatriate women's footballers
Expatriate women's footballers in Italy
French expatriate sportspeople in Italy
Sportspeople from Nord (French department)
Footballers from Hauts-de-France
FCF Hénin-Beaumont players